Eye Weekly was a free weekly newspaper published in Toronto, Ontario, Canada. It was owned by Torstar, the parent company of the Toronto Star, and was published by their Star Media Group until its final issue on May 5, 2011. The following week, Torstar launched a successor publication, The Grid.

History 
Eye Weekly began publishing on October 10, 1991. The content was first posted online via Usenet in March 1994, and its website launched in October 1994, becoming one of the first publications to put its content online. It had an audited circulation of 120,000 copies, as of a 2005-2007 report.

Past contributors
Prominent contributors at various points through the newspaper's life included Jason Anderson, Bert Archer, Gregory Boyd Bell, Carolyn Bennett, Denise Benson, Stuart Berman, Alex Bozikovic, Andrew Braithwaite, William Burrill, Jason Chiu, Andrew Clark, Tyler Clark Burke, Nicole Cohen, Kevin Connolly, Peter Darbyshire, Gemma Files, Sky Gilbert, Kieran Grant, Kevin Hainey, Bob Hunter, Paul Isaacs, Bruce LaBruce, Edward Keenan, Guy Leshinski, Chris Dart, Chandler Levack, Laura Lind, Sarah Liss, Donna Lypchuk, Cindy McGlynn, Gord McLaughlin, Jim Munroe, Dave Morris, Bruce Farley Mowat, C.J. O'Connor, Gord Perks, Bradley Reinhardt, Damian Rogers, Stuart Ross, Sasha, John Sewell, Phoebe Smith, Vern Smith, Kamal Al-Solaylee, Hannah Sung, Marc Weisblott, and Carlyn Zwarenstein.

See also
List of newspapers in Canada

References

Alternative weekly newspapers published in Canada
Torstar publications
Newspapers published in Toronto
Publications established in 1991
Publications disestablished in 2011
Defunct newspapers published in Ontario
Weekly newspapers published in Ontario
1991 establishments in Ontario
2011 disestablishments in Ontario